Mikula may refer to:

Mikula (surname)
 Mikula Golubev, fictional mutant character published by Marvel Comics
 2969 Mikula, a Main-belt Asteroid
 The protagonist of the Croatian film Captain Mikula, the Kid